CAMCO or Camco may refer to:

 Camco, Tibet
 Central Aircraft Manufacturing Company, a defunct aircraft manufacturer
 Capital Acquisitions and Management Corporation, a defunct debt collection company
 General Electric’s Canadian appliance manufacturing company in Toronto, Ontario
 Camco Drum Company, a defunct drum company
 The nickname for Camden County (disambiguation)